Kholkovsky is a rural locality (a settlement) in Turgenevskoye Rural Settlement, Melenkovsky District, Vladimir Oblast, Russia. The population was 165 as of 2010. There are 2 streets.

Geography 
Krasnovo is the nearest rural locality.

References 

Rural localities in Melenkovsky District